Luxembourg competed at the 1936 Winter Olympics in Garmisch-Partenkirchen, Germany.  The nation returned to the Winter Games after missing the 1932 Winter Olympics.

Alpine skiing

Men

Bobsleigh

References

 Olympic Winter Games 1936, full results by sports-reference.com

Nations at the 1936 Winter Olympics
1936
Olympics, Winter